In the circulatory system of fish, the bulbus arteriosus is a pear shaped chamber that functions as a capacitor, maintaining continuous blood flow into the gill arches.

References
1. "ZFIN: Anatomical Structure: Bulbus Arteriosus." ZFIN: The Zebrafish Model Organism Database. Web. 8 May 2011. <http://zfin.org/action/anatomy/term-detail?anatomyItem.zdbID=ZDB-ANAT-011113-107>.

Fish anatomy